"Bread and Circuses" is the twenty-fifth and penultimate episode of the second season of the American science fiction television series Star Trek. Written by Gene Roddenberry and Gene L. Coon and directed by Ralph Senensky, it was first broadcast on March 15, 1968.

In the episode, Captain Kirk and his companions are forced to fight in gladiatorial games on a planet resembling the Roman Empire, but possessing mid-20th century Earth technology.

Its name is a reference to the phrase "bread and circuses" taken from the Satire X written by the poet Juvenal. In modern usage, the phrase implies a populace distracted from greater issues by the base pleasures of food and entertainment.

Plot
The Federation starship  USS Enterprise is on routine patrol when it finds wreckage of a survey vessel, the SS Beagle. The Beagle was under the command of Captain R. M. Merik (William Smithers), whom Captain Kirk knew during his academy days. First Officer Spock traces the path of debris to a planet in the previously unexplored "System 892".

Upon arrival, the Enterprise crew monitors a 20th-century-style television broadcast from the planet showing footage of what appears to be a Roman gladiatorial match. The planet's culture is thus revealed to be a kind of 20th-century parallel to Earth's Ancient Rome. An announcer refers to one of the gladiators as William B. Harrison (who is killed); Spock identifies him from ship's records as one of the Beagles flight officers.

Kirk, Spock and Dr. McCoy beam down to the planet to investigate. They are captured and brought before Septimus (Ian Wolfe), the leader of a group of runaway slaves, who asks them if they are "children of the Sun". Septimus explains that he was a senator until he heard the "words of the Sun" and was made a slave. Although another slave, Flavius (Rhodes Reason), suggests killing the landing party, Septimus decides the landing party poses no threat. 
 
Kirk reveals that he is looking for Captain Merik, who the slaves suggest is Mericus, First Citizen. Flavius, a former gladiator, offers to help and leads Kirk and his party to the nearby city. They are soon captured and brought before Mericus, who is in fact Merik, and the Proconsul Claudius Marcus (Logan Ramsey), who invites the landing party to sit and talk in private.  Merik explains that the Beagle suffered damage and Merik came down to look for ore to repair his ship; he relates that when he met Claudius Marcus and came to know his culture, he agreed that the planet should be protected from cultural contamination at all costs. Merik decided to stay, putting his crewmen into the gladiatorial matches, where they would be killed (Harrison was called the "last of the barbarians"). Merik and Marcus try to persuade Kirk to have the Enterprise crew abandon their ship and integrate into the planet's culture. Kirk refuses their demands and instead signals to Chief Engineer Scott, in code, that the landing party is in trouble, but that no rescue attempt should be made.

Angered, Marcus sends Spock and McCoy into the televised arena where they must fight Flavius and another gladiator, Achilles. Spock overpowers Achilles and uses a Vulcan nerve pinch on Flavius, ending the fight to a hail of pre-recorded boos and hisses. Spock and McCoy are taken back to the slave pens while Kirk is sentenced to a televised execution scheduled for the next day by the TV Manager aka "Master of the Games". 

The evening prior to the execution, Kirk is brought to the Proconsul's quarters, where the slave girl Drusilla entertains him, probably including sexual relations. Marcus later remarks to Kirk that he was responsible for Drusilla's visit, saying "Because you are a man, I gave you some last hours as a man."

As the execution broadcast begins, Flavius rushes forward and is killed trying to save Kirk; Kirk kills the Master of the Games and two guards as well. Marcus orders the remaining guards to kill Kirk; on the Enterprise, Scott uses the ship's tractor beams to cause a power blackout in the city, allowing Kirk to free Spock and McCoy. Merik signals the Enterprise with a stolen communicator to beam up Kirk and party, and is fatally stabbed by Marcus. The landing party dematerializes just one second before the guards open fire with their machine guns.

Back on the Enterprise, Spock expresses surprise at a sun-worshiping cult preaching universal brotherhood, opining that sun worship was primitive superstition, with no such philosophy behind it. Lt. Uhura, having monitored the planet's communications all this time, has the answer: "It's not the sun up in the sky. It's the Son of God." The Captain is astonished: "Caesar and Christ. They had them both. And the Word is spreading only now."

Production
The submachine guns used by the Roman guards in the episode are Danish Madsen M-50 submachine guns.

Lois Jewell said in an interview that two costumes were made for her character, a grey slave outfit and the revealing evening wear she entertained Captain Kirk in. Of that she said, "That was a very exotic costume. It was made by the designer who designed everything for Star Trek. It wasn’t like they went, “Well, let’s throw this on.” It was designed and it was made, and they had to make sure, in the fitting, that it fit properly. And I wore that. I still get a lot of comments when I’m at the Star Trek shows about that costume. Everybody talks about that costume."

The character Claudius Marcus wears the Shakespeare coat of arms on his costume, one of many examples of Shakespeare in Star Trek.

Gene Winfield, an American automotive customizer and fabricator's car The Reactor, called The Jupiter 8 in the episode was used at the opening.

Reception 
In 2013, W.I.R.E.D. magazine ranked this episode one of the top ten most underrated episodes of the original television series.

A 2018 Star Trek binge-watching guide by Den of Geek, recommended this episode as one of the best of the original series.

References

External links

 

 "Bread and Circuses" Review of the remastered version at TrekMovie.com

Star Trek: The Original Series (season 2) episodes
1968 American television episodes
Television episodes written by Gene L. Coon
Television episodes written by Gene Roddenberry
Gladiatorial combat in fiction
Television episodes directed by Ralph Senensky